Fletcher Norton may refer to:

Fletcher Norton, 1st Baron Grantley (1716–1789), English lawyer and MP from 1756 to 1782
Fletcher Norton (judge) (1744–1820), Anglo-Scottish barrister and MP, son of 1st Baron Grantley and father of 3rd Baron Grantley
Fletcher Norton, 3rd Baron Grantley (1796–1875), English peer, grandson of 1st Baron, nephew of 2nd Baron
Fletcher Norton (1877–1941), American actor in 1920s and 1930s films (The Big House)